Willi Jentzsch (15 May 1886 in Bitterfeld-Wolfen – 23 May 1936 in the Free City of Danzig) was a German teacher, school administrator and politician. On 1 November 1927, he was appointed rector of the renowned Gymnasium St. Johann in Fleischergasse. In March 1936, he became school director in Danzig, and thus head of all elementary schools in the city-state.

Family 
Willi Jentzsch was the son of Wilhelm Jentzsch, a landowner who belonged to a prominent family in Bitterfeld-Wolfen.

Jentzsch married Gertrud Alma Drange in 1921 in Danzig. She was the daughter of Emil Drange, who made career in the administration of the Eastern Prussian city of Elbing. Through their daughter Herlind, who married Horst Kasner, Willi and Gertrud Jentzsch were the maternal grandparents of Angela Merkel (née Kasner). After the death of Willi Jentzsch in 1936, his family relocated to Hamburg.

Ancestry

References
Die Kanzlerin und ihre Welt by Stefan Kornelius, 
 Prominente Elbinger - Ostpreussen

Heads of schools in Germany
People from the Kingdom of Prussia
Free City of Danzig politicians
Angela Merkel
1886 births
1936 deaths